is a passenger railway station located in the city of Kaizuka, Osaka Prefecture, Japan, operated by the private railway operator Mizuma Railway.

Lines

Layout
The station consists of one deadheaded island platform serving two tracks.

Adjacent stations

History
Mizuma Kannon Station opened on January 30, 1926 as .The reinforced concrete-made building from 1926 is a National Registered Tangible Cultural Property. The station was renamed from Mizuma to Mizuma Kannon on June 1, 2009.

Passenger statistics
In fiscal 2019, the station was used by an average of 1434 passengers daily.

Surrounding area
 Mizuma-dera (Mizuma Kannon)
 Mizuma Park
Koon-ji
Okumizuma Onsen
Osaka Kawasaki Rehabilitation University
Kaizuka City Katsuragi Elementary School
Kaizuka City Eiju Elementary School

See also
 List of railway stations in Japan

Reference

External links

 Schedule 

Railway stations in Japan opened in 1926
Railway stations in Osaka Prefecture
Kaizuka, Osaka
Registered Tangible Cultural Properties